Champhol is a commune in the Eure-et-Loir department in northern France. The 18th-century French poet and playwright Gérard Du Doyer de Gastels (1732–1798) was born in this village.

Population

See also
Communes of the Eure-et-Loir department

References

External links

Official site

Communes of Eure-et-Loir
Eure-et-Loir communes articles needing translation from French Wikipedia